The Santa Barbara Botanic Garden is a , containing over 1,000 species of rare and indigenous plants. It is located in Mission Canyon, Santa Barbara, California, United States.

The purpose of the Garden is to display California native plants in natural settings. Mission Creek flows through the premises, and includes a rock dam which was constructed in 1806 by Native Americans (mainly Canaliños) under the direction of the Spanish padres of the adjacent Mission Santa Barbara.

History
The Garden was founded in 1926 and designed by landscape architect Beatrix Farrand. By 1936 its focus had narrowed to plants native to the California Floristic Province (which includes a bit of southwestern Oregon and part of Baja California, as well as most of the state of California). The Garden became a Santa Barbara County Historical Landmark in 1983 (the dam on Mission Creek was already designated as a State Historic Landmark).

On May 6, 2009, part of the Botanic Garden was burned in the Jesusita Fire, which burned much of the front country of the Santa Ynez Mountains behind Santa Barbara. While garden displays have recovered from the devastating effects of the fire, several buildings were destroyed. One was the century-old Gane House, which contained the overstock for the garden library as well as many of the tools used for garden upkeep; the home of the garden's director; and a wooden deck overlooking the creek. June, 2015 marks the ground-breaking on the new John C. Pritzlaff Conservation Center at the site of the old Gane House. The building opened in 2016.

Plant breeding
The Garden has a plant breeding program. Plant introduction include Aesculus californica 'Canyon Pink', Agave shawii, Arctostaphylos 'White Lanterns', Arctostaphylos 'Canyon Blush', Arctostaphylos insularis 'Canyon Sparkles', Artemisia californica 'Canyon Gray', Berberis aquifolium 'Mission Canyon', Ceanothus 'Wheeler Canyon', Ceanothus 'Far Horizons', Ceanothus arboreus 'Powder Blue', Eriophyllum nevinii 'Canyon Silver', Fremontodendron 'Dara's Gold', Heuchera 'Blushing Bells', Heuchera 'Canyon Belle', Heuchera 'Canyon Chimes', Heuchera 'Canyon Delight', Heuchera 'Canyon Duet', Heuchera 'Canyon Melody', Heuchera 'Canyon Pink', Heuchera 'Dainty Bells', Heuchera 'Pink Wave', Iris 'Canyon Snow', Lessingia filaginifolia 'Silver Carpet', Leymus condensatus 'Canyon Prince', Salvia 'Dara's Choice', Salvia cedrosensis 'Baja Blanca', Salvia leucophylla 'Amethyst Bluff', and Verbena lilacina 'De La Mina'.

See also 
 List of botanical gardens in the United States
 North American Plant Collections Consortium

References

External links 

Botanical gardens in California
Parks in Santa Barbara, California
Flora of California
Santa Ynez Mountains
1926 establishments in California
Protected areas established in 1926
History of Santa Barbara County, California
Tourist attractions in Santa Barbara, California
Flora without expected TNC conservation status